The 23rd Miss Chinese International Pageant, Miss Chinese International Pageant 2012 was held on January 15, 2012. Miss Chinese International 2010, Eliza Sam from Vancouver, British Columbia, Canada crowned her successor, Kelly Cheung from Chicago, USA at the end of the pageant.  Cheung represented Hong Kong, China at Miss World 2012, becoming the first Miss Chinese International titleholder to represent the region in a Miss World Pageant that is not a Miss Hong Kong Pageant titleholder.

Pageant information
The slogan to this year's pageant is "The Blooming of Cosmopolitan Charm" 「綻放大都會魅力」.  The pageant was supposed to be held in the fall of 2011 but was delayed until early 2012 by the organizers.  Hence, several 2010 regional titleholders had already crowned their successors in 2011 and were unable to enter the pageant.  However, TVB decided to let both 2010 and 2011 titleholders compete; therefore, this year marked the first time where there are multiple representatives of the same region competing together, including Auckland, Melbourne, Kuala Lumpur, Montreal, Toronto and Vancouver.  The delegates representing Mainland China were chosen from a regional competition Miss Chinese International Pageant Mainland China Regional Competition 2011.

Also, the organizers decided to group the delegates into three regions: Asia-Pacific, Euro-America and Greater China.  While all delegates competed for the crown, first and second runners-up, Miss Friendship and Miss Cosmopolitan, there are three regional awards that were awarded to delegates from each of the three regions: "Asia-Pacific Region Glamour Award", "Euro-America Region Vitality Award" and "Greater China Region Classic Elegance Award".

Results

Special awards

Historical Significance
This marks the first time since the pageant began where no Canadian representative placed within the semi-finals. Ashton Hong from Toronto won the Miss Friendship award and is the only Canadian representative of this year to win an award.

Contestant list

Contestants that have received media attention
By coincidence, the Winner and well known model Chicago representative Kelly Cheung was chosen by lottery to try on the Miss Chinese International crown and scepter at the kickoff press conference on January 6, 2012.
Vancouver representative Erica Chui is daughter of actor Norman Chui 徐少強 and actress Shirley Yim 雪梨, and niece of award-winning actress Michelle Yim 米雪 and received media attention although she tried to hide her identity.
Kuala Lumpur representative and second runner-up, Lenna Lim and Hong Kong representative Rebecca Zhu are compared as look-alikes to Miss Chinese International Pageant 2005 1st runner-up and award-winning actress Fala Chen 陳法拉 and received media attention due to the comparison.

References

External links
 Miss Chinese International Pageant 2012 Official Site

TVB
2012 beauty pageants
Beauty pageants in Hong Kong
Miss Chinese International Pageants